The 1993 World Judo Championships were the 18th edition of the World Judo Championships, and were held in Hamilton, Canada from September 30 to October 3, 1993.

Medal overview

Men

Women

Medal table

References

W
World Judo Championships
World Judo Championships
International sports competitions hosted by Canada
World Judo
Sports competitions in Hamilton, Ontario